Element name may refer to:

A data element name in a database
A name of a chemical element (Chemical_element#Element_names)

See also
 Systematic element name
 List of chemical elements
 List of chemical element name etymologies